The Munga-Thirri–Simpson Desert Regional Reserve (formerly Simpson Desert Regional Reserve) was a protected area located in the Australian state of South Australia within the gazetted locality of Simpson Desert.   The regional reserve's name was altered on 2 August 2018 by the Government of South Australia.  The regional reserve was classified as an IUCN Category VI protected area.

 it was merged with the Munga-Thirri—Simpson Desert Conservation Park to create the Munga-Thirri–Simpson Desert National Park.

See also
 Protected areas of South Australia
 Regional reserves of South Australia
 Regional Reserve (Australia)
 Simpson Desert
 Simpson Desert Important Bird Area
 Munga-Thirri National Park, Queensland

References

External links
A Review of the Simpson Desert Regional Reserve 1988 - 1998 (pdf) - Department for Environment and Heritage

Regional reserves of South Australia
Protected areas established in 1985
1985 establishments in Australia
Far North (South Australia)